The name Ellie has been used for four tropical cyclones worldwide, two in the Western Pacific ocean and two in the Australian region.

Western Pacific
 Typhoon Ellie (1991) – an unusually small typhoon which hit Taiwan as a tropical storm
 Typhoon Ellie (1994) – Category 1 typhoon impact Japan, Northeast China and Korean Peninsula

Australian region
 Cyclone Ellie (2009) – Category 1 tropical cyclone (Australian scale), made landfall Queensland
 Cyclone Ellie (2022) – Category 1 tropical cyclone (Australian scale), made landfall 22 December 2022 Western Australia and Northern Territory; continued until 8 January 2023 

Pacific typhoon set index articles
Australian region cyclone set index articles